Ilya Konstantinovich Zuyev (born 25 January 1994) is a Russian football player. He plays for FC Akron Tolyatti.

Club career
He made his professional debut in the Russian Professional Football League for FC Zenit-2 St. Petersburg on 4 August 2013 in a game against FC Torpedo Vladimir.

He made his Russian Football National League debut for Zenit-2 on 12 July 2015 in a game against FC Torpedo Armavir.

References

1994 births
Footballers from Saint Petersburg
Living people
Russian footballers
Russia youth international footballers
Russia under-21 international footballers
Association football defenders
FC Tom Tomsk players
FC Zenit-2 Saint Petersburg players
FC Urozhay Krasnodar players
FC Nizhny Novgorod (2015) players
FC Akron Tolyatti players
FC Zenit Saint Petersburg players
Russian First League players
Russian Second League players